ICE - International Currency Exchange - often known simply as 'ICE' - is a global foreign currency exchange company, based in London. 

As one of the largest retail currency exchange operators in the world, with a combined annual group turnover in excess of US$1.8 billion, ICE operates a global network of over 300 bureaux de change branches, including 65 airports, across four continents.

ICE were the first foreign exchange operator to offer a pre-paid currency card and also to offer a voucher system, whereby customers are able to get discounted exchange rates by visiting the company's website before picking up their currency.

ICE is a Private Limited Company owned by Lenlyn Group, and is a sister company of Raphaels Bank. The organisation's headquarters are in Piccadilly, London.

Services
 Travel Money
 Click & Collect
 Pre-paid Currency Cards
 International money transfer
 Multi-Currency ATMs
 Associated Currency Exchange Services

References

External links
Official Website

Foreign exchange companies
1973 establishments in England
Financial services companies based in London
Financial services companies established in 1973